Nabi Yunis is the highest point of the Palestinian territories, with an altitude of 1,030 metres (3,380 ft). It is located in the town of Halhul, Hebron Governorate.

See also
 Geography of the Palestinian territories
 Geography of the West Bank
 Tall Asur, one of the highest points in the West Bank (1,016 m / 3,333 ft)
 List of countries by highest point (Countries with disputed sovereignty)

References

Mountains of the West Bank
Highest points of countries